Donna Jeanette D'Errico (born March 30, 1968) is an American actress and model. She posed for Playboy as its Playmate of the Month for September 1995 and had a starring role (1996–1998) on the television series Baywatch. She continues to act in films and on television.

Career 
Before appearing in Playboy, D'Errico had a Las Vegas-based limousine company. When Playboy chose her as its Playmate of the Month for September 1995, her centerfold was photographed by Richard Fegley.

She was chosen for a starring role on the television series Baywatch, as "Donna Marco" for two seasons, from 1996 to 1998. One installment of the program dealt with her Playboy layout. She was also a host of the show Battlebots and starred in Candyman: Day of the Dead. For a time, she owned Zen Spa, a day spa in Calabasas, California. After leaving Baywatch, she appeared in independent films, including Intervention, Inconceivable, and The Making of Plus One alongside Andie MacDowell, Jennifer Tilly, Colm Feore, and Elizabeth McGovern.

Personal life
D'Errico divorced rock musician Nikki Sixx in 2007, after 11 years of marriage. They had previously separated shortly after their daughter's birth, and then reconciled months later when Sixx completed rehab. D'Errico later filed for divorce on April 27, 2006, citing irreconcilable differences. Together they had one daughter born in 2001.  D'Errico also has a son, film composer Rhyan D'Errico (born 1993). D'Errico supports animal rights and is a vegan.
D'Errico is a Roman Catholic, who attends Mass weekly and prays the Rosary every night with her children.

Mount Ararat expedition
In 2011, D'Errico said she was in training to fulfill a long-held dream of climbing Mount Ararat in Turkey to search for frozen remains of the Biblical Noah's ark. D'Errico climbed Mount Ararat in mid-2012, returning home to the U.S. in August, having suffered injuries from a fall near the end of the climb.

Filmography

References

External links
 

1968 births
American film actresses
American people of Italian descent
American television actresses
Living people
Actors from Columbus, Georgia
People from Dothan, Alabama
1990s Playboy Playmates
20th-century American actresses
21st-century American actresses
Actresses from Alabama
Actresses from Georgia (U.S. state)
Catholics from Alabama
Catholics from Georgia (U.S. state)
Mount Ararat